The 2020 Professional Chess Association of the Philippines draft was held on December 20, 2020 at the Quezon City Sports Club.

It is the first-ever draft held by the Professional Chess Association of the Philippines (PCAP). The draft was held to determine the initial composition of PCAP's 24 teams for its inaugural 2021 season.

The draft had around 350 applicants. The draft lasted around four hours and had four rounds.

Grandmaster Eugene Torre was the first pick of the draft. The Rizal Towers selected Torre to play for them.

Draft order
All 24 teams of PCAP participated in the draft, with the draft order determined through the drawing of lots. Antipolo was drawn as the first team to select a player in the draft but they made a deal with 7th team Rizal Towers to swap places in the first round in order for Rizal to be able to select Eugene Torre. Torre is a friend of the Rizal Towers owner, Ed Madrid.

Draft selection

First round

Source: Spin.ph

Trades involving draft picks

Draft-day trades
Draft-day trades were made on December 20, 2020, the day of the draft.

References

2020 in Philippine sport
Drafts (sports)
December 2020 sports events in the Philippines